Alexandra Park Zoo is a small zoo located in Bundaberg West, Queensland, Australia. Animal species at the zoo include cotton-top tamarin, dingo, swamp wallaby, parma wallaby, spotted-tailed quoll, lace monitor, freckled monitor, eastern bearded dragon, land mullet, coastal carpet python, brown tree snake, white-throated snapping turtle, emu, red-tailed black cockatoo, sulphur-crested cockatoo, eclectus parrot, princess parrot and red-winged parrot. 

In the past the zoo was home to a female radiated tortoise named Torty who was over 136 years old when she died on 20 February 1984. The zoo is open daily from 9:30am-4:30pm.

References

External links

Zoos in Queensland
1911 establishments in Australia
Zoos established in 1911
Tourist attractions in Bundaberg